The Field Elm cultivar Ulmus minor 'Sowerbyi', commonly known as the Sowerby Elm,  was described (as Ulmus nitens var. sowerbyi Moss) by Moss in The Cambridge British Flora (1914). The tree, once referred to as the 'Norfolk Elm' by Smith, was commonly found in the hedgerows and woods of Norfolk, Cambridgeshire, and Huntingdonshire in the early 20th century before the advent of Dutch elm disease. Melville considered it a hybrid of 'Coritana'.

The tree was named for the botanical artist James Sowerby, who had illustrated it in English Botany, or Coloured Figures of British Plants (1863, figure T.2248), from a specimen collected in Essex c.1810 and now in the Borrer Herbarium at Kew.

Description
A smaller tree than 'Hunnybunii', the branches shorter and the upper ones very tortuous; leaves smaller and acute. The obovate to elliptical fruits are also smaller than 'Hunnybunii'. "Type" specimens of leaves and samarae from the Parker Street tree in Cambridge (see 'Notable trees'), obtained on the instructions of Moss, are preserved in the Cambridge University Herbarium.

Pests and diseases
Though susceptible to Dutch Elm Disease, field elms produce suckers and usually survive in this form in their area of origin.

Cultivation
Moss in The Cambridge British Flora (1914) described 'Sowerbyi' as "often planted, as on Christ's Pieces, Cambridge". Herbarium specimens from Wageningen suggest that 'Sowerby' was cultivated in The Netherlands in the mid-20th century, possibly as part of the elm collection assembled there the 1930s for DED-testing by Christine Buisman, on behalf of the Dutch Elm Committee. No mature specimens are known to survive.

Notable trees
In 1954 the tree, which had lad lower horizontal branches removed in the 1940s, had a bole-girth of 16 feet and was estimated to be about 250 years old. In addition to F. G. Preston's c.1914 photograph, a second photograph of the tree, showing its tortuous winter branching, appeared in the Cambridge Daily News in 1954. Shortly after, the tree was propagated by the University Botanic Garden, and severely pruned owing to decay.

References

External links
  Samarae labelled Ulmus nitens var. sowerbyi; Christ's Piece corner, Cambridge, 1938
  Formerly labelled U. foliacea 'Sowerbyi'; Wageningen specimen, 1962
  Formerly labelled U. foliacea 'Sowerbyi'; Wageningen specimen, 1962

Field elm cultivar
Ulmus articles with images
Ulmus